Abdüllatif Şener (born 1954) is a Turkish politician. He was Minister of Finance of Turkey from 1996 to 1997 and Deputy Prime Minister from 2002 to 2007, under Prime Minister Recep Tayyip Erdoğan.

Life and career
Şener was born in Gürün, Sivas Province in Turkey. He graduated from the School of Political Sciences at Ankara University. He earned his PhD degree from Gazi University in Ankara. He lectured on finance at Gazi University and Hacettepe University, before he served as a controller in the Department of Revenues within the Ministry of Finance.

Şener entered politics and was elected in 1991 as deputy of Sivas Province from the Islamist Welfare Party (Turkish: Refah Partisi, abbreviated RP). He was Minister of Finance from 1996 to 1997. Following the ban of the Welfare Party in 1998, he became a member of the newly established Virtue Party (Turkish: Fazilet Partisi, abbreviated FP), which was also banned after three years in 2001. He was co-founder of the Justice and Development Party (AKP) in 2001. He was elected to the Grand National Assembly of Turkey as deputy of Sivas Province, and he served under the AKP government as Deputy Prime Minister from 2002 to 2007.

He did not run for a seat in parliament in the 2007 general elections. After leaving the AK Party, he formed a new party; it was officially announced on 27 May 2009 and named the Turkey Party (Türkiye Partisi).

Şener announced that the Turkey Party was officially closed on 27 August 2012 due to difficulties in maintaining its political goals outside of parliament.

In an interview with Halk TV, Şener strongly condemned the AK Party's handling of the 2013 protests in Turkey.

References 

1954 births
Living people
People from Gürün
Welfare Party politicians
Virtue Party politicians
Justice and Development Party (Turkey) politicians
Turkey Party politicians
Turkish people of Circassian descent
Deputy Prime Ministers of Turkey
Ministers of Finance of Turkey
Deputies of Sivas
Leaders of political parties in Turkey
Turkish civil servants
Ankara University Faculty of Political Sciences alumni
Gazi University alumni
Academic staff of Gazi University
Academic staff of Hacettepe University
Members of the 22nd Parliament of Turkey
Members of the 21st Parliament of Turkey
Members of the 20th Parliament of Turkey
Members of the 54th government of Turkey